The list of Karnataka Rajyotsava Award recipients for the year 2005 is below.

References

Rajyotsava Award